The seventh Connecticut House of Representatives district elects one member of the Connecticut House of Representatives. Its current representative is Joshua M. Hall. The district consists of the west- and north-central parts of the city of Hartford, including the neighborhoods of Asylum Hill and Upper Albany. The district is one of few in Connecticut to have a black majority population, along with the neighboring 1st district and 5th districts.

List of representatives

Recent elections

External links 
 Google Maps - Connecticut House Districts

References

07
Hartford, Connecticut